Edremit is a city and district of Balıkesir Province in the Aegean region of Turkey.

It is situated at the tip of the gulf with the same name (Gulf of Edremit), with its town centre a few kilometres inland, and is an important centre of trade, along with the other towns that are situated on the same gulf (namely Ayvalık, Gömeç, Burhaniye and Havran). It is also one of the largest district centres of Balıkesir Province. The district of Edremit, especially around Kazdağı, is largely covered with forests. The mayor of Edremit municipality is Selman Hasan Arslan.

History 

The modern city of Edremit is named after the ancient city of Adramyttion or Adramytteion (Ἀδραμύττειον), a city of Asia Minor on the coast of Aeolis which is in near city Modern Burhaniye

Tahtacı Turkmen, descendants of the army of Shah Ismail I, settled in the mountains near Edremit after their defeat in the Battle of Chaldiran in 1514.

By 1819, Henry Alexander Scammell Dearborn reported that Edremit was only populated by "a few Greek fishermen". In 1912, the town had 6200 inhabitants, 1200 of which were Greeks. At this time, the district had 19 Greek schools and roughly 600 pupils.

In May 1914, thousands of Muslim refugees who had fled from the Balkans arrived in the town of Edremit and proceeded to ransack the shops and homes of the town's Greek community. According to Arnold J. Toynbee, the Ottoman government armed and organised the refugees. Many Greeks found refuge in the town church before fleeing to the harbour where they were then granted passage to the neighbouring island of Lesbos. Turks continued to massacre or evict Greeks in the following months in surrounding villages. The Greek army occupied the town on 19 June 1920 but withdrew in late August 1922 and all remaining Greeks fled or were killed by the Turkish army.

Economy 
Edremit's economy relies largely on the production of olives, as well as on tourism. Edremit is known as the olive capital of Turkey. Kaz Dağı National Park, extending around the ancient Mount Ida (mentioned in Homer's epic poems such as the Iliad), is situated within the boundaries of Edremit district and is an important tourist attraction with its natural scenery and a number of picturesque small villages around it.

Demographics 
In ethno-cultural terms, the population of Edremit is a mixture of Balkan Turks and Balkan Albanians, descendants of immigrants from Balkans, Aegean Islands, some Circassians, as well as Tahtacı Turkmens, who pursue their own traditions and life-style to this day. A private museum of ethnography in the village of Tahtakuşlar is one of the rare institutions in Turkey focusing on Tahtacı culture.

Notable people 
 Germanos Karavangelis (1866–1935), Metropolitan Bishop of Kastoria and later Amaseia
 Benjamin I of Constantinople (1871-1946), Ecumenical Patriarch of Constantinople
 Panos Dukakis (1896–1979), father of American politician Michael Dukakis
 Sabahattin Ali (1907–1948), author and journalist
 Hülya Avşar (b. 1963), actress
 Caner Erkin (b. 1988), professional footballer

Twin towns — sister cities
Edremit is twinned with:
 Amaliada, Greece since 2000
 Kamp-Lintfort, Germany since 2009
 Erdenet, Mongolia since 2010
 Nicolosi, Italy since 2010

References

Bibliography

External links 

 Pictures of the town of Edremit

Seaside resorts in Turkey
Aegean Sea port cities and towns in Turkey
Populated places in Balıkesir Province
 
Places of the Greek genocide